Susan Daitch is an American novelist and short story writer. In 1996 David Foster Wallace called her "one of the most intelligent and attentive writers at work in the U.S. today."

Biography
Susan Daitch graduated from Barnard College and attended the Whitney Museum Independent Study Program.

She is the author of six novels and a collection of short stories. 

Her work has appeared in Guernica, Bomb, Pacific Review, The Barcelona Review,,  Fault Magazine, Rain Taxi,, Tablet., Tin House,  McSweeney’s, Bomb, Conjunctions, The Norton Anthology of Postmodern American Fiction, and elsewhere.

Her novel, Siege of Comedians was listed as one of the best books of 2021 in The Wall Street Journal.

She taught at Barnard College, Columbia University, and the Iowa Writers’ Workshop.
She teaches at Hunter College.

She was a 2012 New York Foundation for the Arts Fellow.

She is a supporter of Women for Afghan Women.
She lives in Brooklyn.

Bibliography
 L.C. Harcourt Brace Jovanovich, 1987; Dalkey Archive Press, 2002
 The Colorist. Vintage Contemporaries, 1990
 Storytown: Stories. Dalkey Archive Press, 1996  
 Paper Conspiracies. City Lights Books, 2011
 Fall Out. Madras Press, 2013
 The Lost Civilization of Suolucidir. City Lights Books, 2016
 White Lead: A Novel of Suspense. Alibi, 2016 (e-book)
 Siege of Comedians. Dzanc Books, 2021

References

Further reading

External links
Official site

Living people
American women novelists
American women short story writers
20th-century American novelists
20th-century American women writers
21st-century American novelists
21st-century American women writers
Barnard College alumni
Barnard College faculty
Columbia University faculty
Iowa Writers' Workshop faculty
Hunter College faculty
Writers from Brooklyn
20th-century American short story writers
21st-century American short story writers
Novelists from New York (state)
Novelists from Iowa
Year of birth missing (living people)
Emma Willard School alumni
American women academics